The Bangladesh national handball team is the national handball team of Bangladesh and is controlled by the Bangladesh Handball Federation.

Asian Championship record
2018 – 13th place

References

External links

IHF profile

Men's national handball teams
handball